"Don't You Need Somebody" is a song by Moroccan record producer RedOne that features collective vocals by Enrique Iglesias, R. City, Serayah, and Shaggy. It was released on 20 May 2016.

Music video
An official music video was released on 1 August 2016 on RedOne's official channel on YouTube. The video directed by Derek Pike features RedOne gathering people from all walks of life to come together for a party in the city streets.

The previously released Friends of RedOne's Version of the video released on 9 June 2016, includes footage of RedOne with his son, the four featured artists Enrique Iglesias, R. City, Serayah and Shaggy performing the song alongside a host of other personalities pitching in with video footage including singers Akon, Thanh Bùi (of the band North), Aseel Omran, Moroccan rapper and record producer Ali B, Maître Gims, German YouTuber Bianca Heinicke, Jennifer Lopez, John Mamann, Alex Sparrow, David A. Stewart (of the Eurythmics), Kaya Stewart, Jay McGuiness (of The Wanted), French Montana, Tal, The Band Perry, songwriter Bibi Bourelly and Palestinian singer Mohammed Assaf, as well as actor Jean-Claude Van Damme, actor and singer Max Schneider, actress Milla Jovovich, actress and singer Priyanka Chopra, actor and singer Kevin McHale, artist Mr. Brainwash, comedian Howie Mandel, dancer Aliona Vilani, dermatologist Dr. Simon Ourian, media personalities Simo Benbachir (aka Simobb), Perez Hilton, Randy Jackson and Ryan Seacrest, TV personality Kaitlyn Bristowe, model Kristina Bazan, and famous sports personalities who pitched in with their own segments including Blaise Matuidi, David Luiz, Rafael Nadal, Josh Norman, Mesut Özil, James Rodríguez, Cristiano Ronaldo and others.

Track listing
Digital download
"Don't You Need Somebody" (featuring Enrique Iglesias, R. City, Serayah and Shaggy) – 3:27

Digital download
"Don't You Need Somebody" (featuring Enrique Iglesias, Aseel and Shaggy) – 3:34

Remixes – EP
"Don't You Need Somebody" (featuring Enrique Iglesias, R. City, Serayah and Shaggy) [Josh Bernstein – Rannix remix] – 3:11
"Don't You Need Somebody" (featuring Enrique Iglesias, R. City, Serayah and Shaggy) Dash Berlin remix] – 3:02
"Don't You Need Somebody" (featuring Enrique Iglesias, R. City, Serayah and Shaggy) [Ishi remix] – 3:32
"Don't You Need Somebody" (featuring Enrique Iglesias, R. City, Serayah and Shaggy) [Savi x Lema remix] – 3:41
"Don't You Need Somebody" (featuring Enrique Iglesias, R. City, Serayah and Shaggy) [Tropixx Island House remix] – 3:28

Cahill Remix
"Don't You Need Somebody" (featuring Enrique Iglesias, R. City, Serayah and Shaggy) [Cahill Remix] – 3:39

Other versions
With the popularity of the song, language versions are being launched. For the Arab world, a bilingual Arabic and English version was launched by RedOne featuring Enrique Iglesias, Shaggy and for the Arabic section the singer Aseel Omran.

Charts

Weekly charts

Year-end charts

Certifications

References

2016 singles
2016 songs
Songs written by RedOne
Songs written by Enrique Iglesias
Songs written by Sean Douglas (songwriter)
RedOne songs
Enrique Iglesias songs
Rock City (duo) songs
Shaggy (musician) songs
Warner Records singles
Songs written by Jakke Erixson